Spermatogenesis-associated protein 16 is a mammalian protein encoded by the SPATA16 gene. SPATA16, also known as NYD-SP12, is a developmental protein that aids in differentiation of germ cells for spermatogenesis and participates in acrosome formation for appropriate sperm-egg fusion. SPATA16 is located on chromosome 3 at position 26.31 (reverse strand) and is a member of the tetratricopeptide repeat-like superfamily, which facilitate interactions and assemblies between proteins and protein complexes.

Identification
SPATA16 (NYD-SP12) was first identified by a research lab in 2002, led by Dr. Jiahao Sha, at Nanjing Medical University in Nanjing, China. The research team used cDNA microarrays to compare expression levels of genes between adult and fetal human testes. It was discovered that the expression levels of SPATA16 were higher in adult testes than fetal testes, which signified that the gene is required for complete spermatogenesis once a male reaches puberty. Expression of SPATA16 is the highest in testicular tissue; however, SPATA16 is also expressed in several other tissue types including skeletal muscle, nervous tissue, and integumentary system tissue. SPATA16 accumulates around the Golgi apparatus that is perinuclear in the cytoplasm of Sertoli cells; however, the gene is not present in the interstitial cells of Leydig in the testes. Mutations in the SPATA16 gene are associated with male infertility in humans and can cause globozoospermia, which are round-headed sperm without acrosomes. Sperm with incorrect head morphology and absent acrosome are unable to bind to an oocyte for fertilization. Studies involving knockout SPATA16 male mice indicate a slight functional difference of the SPATA16 gene between mice and humans. SPATA16 knockout mice are completely infertile, and it is characterized by spermatogenesis arrest and azoospermia. This is where the differentiation process is obstructed during spermatogenesis and creates immotile sperm. In contrast, infertility caused by SPATA16 mutations in male humans develop spermatozoa that are motile, but their sperm exhibit head and acrosome abnormalities.

References 

Genes on human chromosome 3